Levente Szántai (born 15 November 1982 in Budapest) is a Hungarian football player who currently plays for Mezőkövesd-Zsóry SE.

Honours
Nemzeti Bajnokság I:  Winner 2003

References
European Football Clubs & Squads
Hivatasos Labdarugok Szervete

1982 births
Living people
Footballers from Budapest
Hungarian footballers
Association football goalkeepers
Újpest FC players
MTK Budapest FC players
Kazincbarcikai SC footballers
Diósgyőri VTK players
Soroksári TE footballers
Rákospalotai EAC footballers
Mezőkövesdi SE footballers
Nemzeti Bajnokság I players